KTHT (97.1 FM "Country Legends 97.1") is a commercial radio station licensed to Cleveland, Texas, and serves the northern section of Greater Houston.  The station airs a classic country radio format and is owned by Cox Radio, along with KGLK, KHPT and KKBQ.  The studios and offices are in 3 Post Oak Central in the Uptown Houston district.

KTHT has an effective radiated power (ERP) of 100,000 watts.  The transmitter site is off Route 222 at Bob McGowan Road in Shepherd, Texas, near Sam Houston National Forest.  That puts it about halfway between Houston and Lufkin, Texas.

Station history

Classical KRTK
On January 17, 1993, the station signed on as KRTK, and was owned by Texas Classical Radio, Inc.. KRTK originally simulcast the classical music programming on KRTS in Seabrook, to increase that station's coverage in northern sections of the Houston radio market.  It was sold four years later after KRTS' request to increase power was approved by the Federal Communications Commission (FCC).

Regional Mexican KEYH-FM
In September 1995, 97.1 began simulcasting Regional Mexican-formatted KEYH as KEYH-FM.  The simulcast ended a short time later, as KEYH-FM began to air its own Regional Mexican format as "Estereo 97", which later became  "Que Onda 97" in March 1996.

In January 1997, the station was bought by AMFM, Inc. for $10 million.

Talk, Alternative and Oldies
The call sign switched to KKTL and flipped to news/talk as "Houston's Talk FM, 97 Talk," in September 1997.  The following year, Jacor bought KKTL for $14.7 million.

In March 1999, after the talk format floundered, the station switched to a simulcast of alternative rock-formatted KTBZ-FM "107-5 The Buzz".  KKTL continued simulcasting 107.5 after KTBZ and KLDE ("Oldies 94.5") swapped frequencies in July 2000, making 97.1 an oldies outlet.  The swap was the result of an ownership trade-off in the AMFM/Jacor/Clear Channel merger.

Hot 97.1
In August 2000, Cox acquired KKTL.  On November 4, 2000, the station split from the KLDE simulcast and began stunting with a robotic text-to-speech countdown to Noon, using the same Microsoft Mary voice that KKHT used a month prior. At that time, KKTL flipped to rhythmic contemporary as KTHT, "Hot 97.1". The first song on "Hot" was "Party Up" by DMX.

Country Legends
On January 2, 2003, at Noon, after playing "Back That Thang Up" by Juvenile, KTHT flipped to a classic country format as "Country Legends 97.1". The first song on "Country Legends" was "You Never Even Called Me by My Name" by David Allan Coe.

Core artists include Garth Brooks, Reba McEntire, Willie Nelson, Dolly Parton and Ronnie Milsap.

Station Personalities
Dan Gallo and Chuck Akers hosted mornings until September 2021, when both were let go due to budget cuts.

Jake Stewart, weekday middays.

Christi Brooks, weekdays afternoons

Call Sign History
KRTK - 05/03/1991 (K-Arts)
KEYH-FM - 09/18/1995
KOHD - 03/11/1996
KRTK - 02/10/1997 (K-Arts again)
KKTL - 09/22/1997 (97 Talk)
KKTL-FM - 03/19/1999 (simulcast of 107-5 The Buzz, Oldies 107.5)
KTHT - 11/13/2000 (Hot 97-1, Country Legends 97.1)

References

External links

THT
Cox Media Group
Radio stations established in 1991
1991 establishments in Texas